Rybárik (feminine: Rybáriková) is a Slovak surname. It may be derived from the occupation/surname Rybár literally meaning "fisher" or "fisherman". The word may also literally mean "kingfisher". Notable people with this surname include:

Jakub Rybárik, Slovak actor
Magdaléna Rybáriková

Occupational surnames
Slovak-language surnames